The 1966 Harvard Crimson football team was an American football team that represented Harvard University during the 1966 NCAA University Division football season. Harvard shared the championship of the Ivy League in a three-way tie.

In their tenth year under head coach John Yovicsin, the Crimson compiled an 8–1 record and outscored opponents 231 to 60. Justin P. Hughes was the team captain.

Harvard's 6–1 conference record earned a three-way tie for first place in the Ivy League standings. The Crimson outscored Ivy opponents 156 to 53. Harvard defeated one of its co-champions, Dartmouth, and suffered its lone loss to the other co-champion, Princeton.  

Harvard played its home games at Harvard Stadium in the Allston neighborhood of Boston, Massachusetts.

Actor Tommy Lee Jones was a guard on the team.

Schedule

References

Harvard
Harvard Crimson football seasons
Ivy League football champion seasons
Harvard Crimson football
1960s in Boston